Lady Sarah Lennox (14 February 1745 – August 1826) was the most notorious of the famous Lennox sisters, daughters of Charles Lennox, 2nd Duke of Richmond and Sarah Cadogan.

Early life
After the deaths of both her parents when she was only five years old, Lady Sarah was brought up by her elder sister Emily in Ireland. Lady Sarah returned to London and the home of her sister Lady Caroline Fox when she was thirteen. Having been a favourite of King George II since her childhood, she was invited to appear at court and there caught the eye of George, Prince of Wales (the future King George III), whom she had met as a child.

When she was presented at court again at the age of fifteen, George III was taken with her. Lady Sarah's family encouraged a relationship between her and George III. Lady Sarah had also developed feelings for Lord Newbattle, grandson of William Kerr, 3rd Marquess of Lothian. Although her family were able to persuade her to break with Newbattle, the royal match was scotched by the king's advisors, particularly John Stuart, 3rd Earl of Bute. It was not normal, though by no means prohibited, at the time for monarchs to have non-Royal spouses. Lady Sarah was asked by King George III to be one of the ten bridesmaids at his wedding to Princess Charlotte of Mecklenburg-Strelitz.

Family and marriages 
Lady Sarah refused a proposal of marriage from James Hay, 15th Earl of Erroll, before marrying Charles Bunbury, eldest son of Reverend Sir William Bunbury, 5th Baronet, on 2 June 1762 at Holland House Chapel, Kensington, London. He succeeded his father as sixth Baronet in 1764.

Lady Sarah had an affair with Lord William Gordon, the second son of the Duke of Gordon, and gave birth to his illegitimate daughter in 1768. The child was not immediately disclaimed by Sir Charles, and received the name Louisa Bunbury. Nevertheless, Lady Sarah and Lord William eloped shortly afterwards, in February 1769, taking the infant with them. Lord William soon abandoned her. Sir Charles refused to take her back, and Lady Sarah returned to her brother's house with her child, while her husband introduced into Parliament a motion for a divorce on grounds of adultery, citing her elopement. Lady Sarah resisted the motion, and it was not until 14 May 1776 that the decree of divorce was issued.

Lady Sarah married an army officer, Hon. George Napier, on 27 August 1781 and had eight children:

 General Sir Charles James Napier (10 August 1782 – 29 August 1853); married Elizabeth Oakeley in April 1827. He remarried Frances Philipp in 1835.
 Emily Louisa Augusta Napier (11 July 1783 – 18 March 1863); married Lt.-Gen. Sir Henry Bunbury, 7th Baronet (nephew of her mother's first husband) on 22 September 1830
 Lieutenant-General Sir George Thomas Napier (30 June 1784 – 8 September 1855); married Margaret Craig on 22 October 1812. They had five children. He married Frances Blencowe in 1839.
 Lieutenant-General Sir William Francis Patrick Napier KCB (17 December 1785 – 12 February 1860); married Caroline Fox (granddaughter of his aunt Lady Caroline Fox) on 14 March 1812. They had five children.
 Richard Napier (1787 – 13 January 1868); married Anna Louisa Stewart, daughter of Sir J. Stewart, in 1817.
 Captain Henry Edward Napier RN (5 March 1789 – 13 October 1853); married Caroline Bennett. They had three children.
 Caroline Napier (1790–1810); died at the age of twenty.
 Cecilia Napier (1791–1808); died at the age of seventeen.

In popular culture
In 1999, a six-part mini-series based on the lives of Sarah Lennox and her sisters aired in the UK. It was called Aristocrats, and Sarah was played by actress Jodhi May.

References

 
 
 
 
 
 

Daughters of British dukes
1745 births
1826 deaths
Women of the Regency era
British and English royal favourites
Sarah
Wives of baronets